Franklin Henry Martin (July 13, 1857 – March 7, 1935) was an American physician. He was the founder of the Journal of the American College of Surgeons and established the American College of Surgeons. Ritter was a member of the National Advisory Commission of the Council of National Defense during World War I.

Early life
Franklin Henry Martin was born on July 13, 1857, in Ixonia, Wisconsin to Edmond Martin. His father fought and died during the Civil War. He worked as a farmhand, brickmaker and school teacher before encouraged by an aunt to study medicine. Martin graduated from Chicago Medical College in 1880 with a M.D.

Career
Martin served as an intern at Mercy Hospital in Chicago. He would practice medicine at Mercy Hospital for the remainder of his life.

In 1883, Martin founded the Chicago South-Side Medico-Social Society where medical papers could be presented. By 1905, Martin established the journal Surgery, Gynecology & Obstetrics, now called the Journal of the American College of Surgeons with other physicians. He served as the managing editor of the journal from 1905 to 1935.

In 1913, Martin established the American College of Surgeons. He served as the Director-General from 1913 to 1935.

After the outbreak of World War I, Martin worked with college fellows to approach the Surgeon General of the U.S. Army to aid in reorganizing and enlarging the Medical Reserve Corps. In 1916, Martin was appointed by President Woodrow Wilson to serve on the National Advisory Commission of the Council of National Defense as the medical representative.

Martin wrote Electricity in Diseases of Women and Obstetrics in 1892. He also wrote South America from a Surgeon's Point of View in 1922.

Personal life
Martin married Isabelle Hallister, the daughter of the Chicago physician John H. Hallister, in 1886.

Martin died on March 7, 1935, in Tucson, Arizona following a short illness. He was buried in Graceland Cemetery.

References

1857 births
1935 deaths
People from Ixonia, Wisconsin
Feinberg School of Medicine alumni 
Physicians from Chicago
Council of National Defense
19th-century American physicians
20th-century American physicians